Chaetogastra campii, synonym Tibouchina campii, is a species of plant in the family Melastomataceae. It is native to Ecuador.

References

campii
Vulnerable plants
Flora of Ecuador
Taxonomy articles created by Polbot